Roald van Hout (born 23 April 1988]) is a Dutch footballer who plays as a winger for Hoofdklasse club UDI '19. He formerly played for RKC Waalwijk, Sparta Rotterdam, FC Eindhoven and Fortuna Sittard.

References

External links
 Voetbal International profile 

1988 births
Living people
Association football wingers
Dutch footballers
Eredivisie players
Eerste Divisie players
Vierde Divisie players
People from Waddinxveen
RKC Waalwijk players
Sparta Rotterdam players
FC Eindhoven players
Fortuna Sittard players
Footballers from South Holland